Suzette Albouy (born 1 January 1965) is a former Bermudian woman cricketer. She made her international debut for Bermuda in the 2008 Women's Cricket World Cup Qualifier.

References

External links 
 

1965 births
Living people
Bermudian women cricketers